is  the head coach of the Takamatsu Five Arrows in the Japanese B.League.

Head coaching record

|-
| style="text-align:left;"|Takamatsu Five Arrows
| style="text-align:left;"|2015-16
| 26||4||22|||| style="text-align:center;"|11th in Bj Western|||-||-||-||
| style="text-align:center;"|21st in Bj 
|-

References

1974 births
Living people

Japanese basketball coaches

Kagawa Five Arrows coaches